William Hoogland (c.1794–1832) was an engraver in Boston, Massachusetts, and New York in the early 19th-century. "Career obscure; but was a designer and engraver of banknotes in New York in 1815." In Boston, contemporaries included Abel Bowen, Annin & Smith, and J.V. Throop. He taught engraving to Joseph Andrews.

Image gallery

References

External links

 WorldCat. Hoogland, William 1794 or 5-1832
 Library of Congress. Pilots' charitable society membership certificate

1794 births
1832 deaths
Artists from Boston
19th century in Boston
American engravers